The Duke Endowment is a private foundation established in 1924 by industrialist and philanthropist James B. Duke.  It supports selected programs of higher education, health care, children's welfare, and spiritual life in North Carolina and South Carolina.

Background
James B. Duke endowed the foundation on December 11, 1924, with $40 million.  In the Indenture of Trust, Duke specified that he wanted the endowment to support Duke University, Davidson College, Furman University, Johnson C. Smith University; non-profit hospitals and children's homes in the two Carolinas; and rural United Methodist churches in North Carolina, retired pastors, and their surviving families.  When Mr. Duke died in 1925, he left the endowment an additional $67 million. Adjusted for present value, Mr. Duke's total gifts would amount to more than $1.3 billion today.

The market value of the endowment's assets has grown to $3.69 billion in 2017.  From 1924 to 2018, the endowment awarded over $3.7 billion in grants.

The Duke Endowment is a co-publisher, along with the North Carolina Institute of Medicine, of the North Carolina Medical Journal, a journal of health policy analysis and debate.

The endowment was established by a trust indenture that specifies how the funds were to be used.  First, $6 million was to be used to either found a Duke University or to enhance Trinity College in Durham, North Carolina, if that school changed its name to Duke University within three months. The remaining funds were to be invested (primarily in Duke Power Company stock). Of the income generated annually by these funds, 20% were to be reinvested, each trustee was to receive 0.2%, and the rest was to be paid out in the following allocation:

References

External links
The Duke Endowment

Medical and health foundations in the United States
Duke family
1924 establishments in North Carolina
Educational foundations in the United States